The Scott County School District is a public school district based in Scott County, Mississippi (USA). The district's headquarters are in Forest.

The district serves the city of Morton and the town of Sebastopol, the community of Harperville. It also includes most of Lake (the portion in Scott County), a portion of Hillsboro and a small portion of Forest, as well as most rural areas in Scott County.

Schools
Morton High School (grades 9-12)
Lake High School (grades 9-12)
Scott Central Attendance Center (grades K-12)
Sebastopol Attendance Center (grades K-12)
Bettye Mae Jack Middle School (grades 5-8)
Lake Middle School (grades 5-8)
Lake Elementary School (grades K-4)
Morton Elementary School (grades K-4)
Lake Elementary School (grades K-4)

Demographics

2006-07 school year
There were a total of 3,938 students enrolled in the Scott County School District during the 2006–2007 school year. The gender makeup of the district was 47% female and 53% male. The racial makeup of the district was 42.43% African American, 52.92% White, 4.11% Hispanic, 0.30% Asian, and 0.23% Native American. 56.4% of the district's students were eligible to receive free lunch.

Previous school years

Accountability statistics

See also
List of school districts in Mississippi

References

External links

Education in Scott County, Mississippi
School districts in Mississippi